Havhingsten fra Glendalough ("The Sea Stallion from Glendalough" or just "Sea Stallion") is a reconstruction of Skuldelev 2, one of the Skuldelev ships and the second-largest Viking longship ever to be found. The original vessel was built in the vicinity of Dublin around 1042, using oak from Glendalough in County Wicklow, Ireland, hence the ship's name. The reconstruction was built in Denmark at the shipyard of the Viking Ship Museum in Roskilde between 2000 and 2004 and is used for historical research purposes.

The ship is a war machine, built to carry many warriors at high speed. It is a bold design, both heavy and strong enough to carry its 112 m² sail, but also sufficiently light and long to be rowed by a crew of 60 — a compromise between strength and lightness.

The ship has been used during the production of historical fiction television series The Last Kingdom.

Research trip to Dublin 2007 

The voyage from Roskilde to Dublin and in 2007-2008 was the culmination of many years of work, and the most ambitious archaeological experiment the museum has ever carried out.

A return voyage to Dublin took place over the summer of 2007. The ship left Roskilde Harbour on 1 July and arrived in Dublin on 14 August.

She was put on display in the Collins Barracks, the Decorative Arts and History building of the National Museum of Ireland, from 17 August 2007 until 29 May 2008. She was then moved to the Grand Canal Dock to be prepared for the journey back to Roskilde on 29 June 2008, and shortly afterwards the National Bank of Denmark issued a 20-kroner commemorative coin in celebration of the event.

The Sea Stallion is lying in the Museum Harbour. The longship is easy to recognize with its characteristic blue, red and yellow strakes.

References

Further reading 
 .
 .
 .
 .
 .

External links 

 The project homepage (English and Danish).
 National Museum of Ireland subsite for the project.
 Boat building in Viking times, the Viking Ship Museum, Denmark.
 The "Sea Stallion" – from Denmark to Dublin. Video highlights of the voyage from Radio Telefís Éireann.
 "Sea Stallion" – Videopodcast 
 Images:     .

2004 ships
Viking ship replicas
Ships built in Denmark